Night of the Demons 2 is a 1994 American horror film directed by Brian Trenchard-Smith and starring Amelia Kinkade, Cristi Harris, Rick Peters, Jennifer Rhodes and Christine Taylor. It is the sequel to Night of the Demons and was released on home video in 1994 by Republic Pictures Home Video. Lionsgate released it on DVD in 2007; Olive Films released a widescreen DVD and a first time Blu-ray release on February 19, 2013. The film was followed by the 1997 sequel Night of the Demons 3.

Plot 
Six years have passed since the events at Hull House on Halloween, and many of the bodies left at Hull House were recovered except for Angela's; rumor persists she descended bodily into Hell. As it turns out, her parents committed suicide five years later after receiving a Halloween card with Angela's signature. A year later her sister Melissa, nicknamed 'Mouse' (Merle Kennedy), is now staying at St. Rita's Academy, a Catholic boarding school for troubled teenagers. She frequently has nightmares about her sister. Rumors spread around the school regarding Mouse, started by the school bully, Shirley (Zoe Trilling). However, the head nun at the school, Sister Gloria (Jennifer Rhodes), tries to put an end to it.

However, Shirley, after getting banned from the school Halloween dance for wrestling on the tennis courts with Kurt (Ladd York) decides to have her own Halloween party at Hull House complete with Mouse and (as a prank) fake carrying out ritual sacrifice she learns from stealing a demonic ritual book from the school brain, Perry (Robert Jayne). Along with her boyfriend Rick (Rick Peters) and Z-Boy (Darin Heames), she tricks Johnny (Johnny Moran), Johnny's girlfriend, Bibi (Cristi Harris), Bibi's friend Terri (Christine Taylor) and Kurt (Ladd York)  to get Mouse to go with them to Hull House, awakening a now demonized Angela. After some bizarre incidents, the group flees the house, minus Z-Boy, who is possessed and raped by Angela in the attic.

Bibi brings a tube of lipstick out of the house which takes on a hellish life of its own. It quickly possesses Shirley and, one by one, Rick, Z-Boy, Terri and Kurt are possessed and/or murdered by demonic Angela (although Terri is saved when Sister Gloria exorcises the demon inside her with Holy Water). Angela's plan is to sacrifice Mouse to the Devil to prove her devotion to him. Sister Gloria, Johnny, Bibi, Father Bob (Rod McCary) and Perry return to Hull House in an attempt to rescue Melissa. Once arriving at the house, the five become separated and Father Bob is quickly killed by the demonic Rick. Johnny is saved by Perry from the demonic Kurt. Unfortunately, Perry is killed by Z-Boy. With the holy water the group brought, Bibi, Johnny and Sister Gloria kill the remaining demons, except for Angela.

After finishing off the demons, the three survivors find Melissa sleeping on an altar. Angela and Sister Gloria debate on what true faith is with Angela stating "Real faith can move mountains, your faith can't even move a mouse." Angela then decapitates Sister Gloria but the sister actually pulls her head down into her habit and survives. With one last ruse to save Melissa and the others, Sister Gloria agrees to take her place on the altar. Angela then hands the sword to Melissa, promising her a great source of power if she kills Sister Gloria. However, Melissa turns the tables and stabs Angela instead. Sister Gloria finishes Angela off with a super soaker filled with holy water. As the four try to leave, they are confronted again by Angela, who has taken the form of a Lamia. Angela attacks them but Johnny manages to kick a hole in the wall in the shape of a cross. The cross-shaped-sunlight falls upon Angela and she explodes. With Angela and her minions dead, Sister Gloria, Melissa, Bibi and Johnny leave the house and return to the school where they are greeted by everyone there. But before the film ends, one student is then seen finding the demonic lipstick which turns into a snake and attacks her.

Production 
Actress Cristi Harris was only 16 when she starred in the film, including performing a topless sex scene.

Cast

Release 
The film was given a limited theatrical release in California by Republic Pictures in May 1994.

Reception 
Night of the Demons 2 received mixed-to-positive reviews from critics. Dread Central praised the film, giving it four out of five blades and stating that the film was "gory, funny, and the perfect treat for a dark and stormy night". In Generation Multiplex: The Image of Youth in Contemporary American Cinema, Timothy Shary wrote that while both films paired teen sexuality and demonic possession together, the teen characters in the sequel were more developed than in its predecessor. JoBlo.com criticized the film, stating that it "has a crappy storyline and no scares" but praised the movie's gore and the acting of Cristi Harris. DVD Verdict also praised the movie's gore as well as the comedic parts, citing the character of Sister Gloria as a highlight. The Los Angeles Times called the film "a smart, amusing horror picture boasting a capable cast".

References

External links 
 
 
 

1994 horror films
1994 films
Films set in 1994
American comedy horror films
American sequel films
Halloween horror films
American haunted house films
Paramount Pictures films
Republic Pictures films
1990s comedy horror films
Films directed by Brian Trenchard-Smith
Films scored by Jimmy Manzie
Demons in film
American erotic horror films
Night of the Demons (film series)
1994 comedy films
1990s English-language films
1990s American films